Rona Hartner (born 9 March 1973, Bucharest) is a French-Romanian actress, painter and singer, of German ethnicity. She is best known for her role in Tony Gatlif's film Gadjo dilo. Hartner currently focuses on her music career, specializing in Gypsy music.

Filmography
 1997: Gadjo dilo by Tony Gatlif                         
 1999: Children of the Stork by Tony Gatlif
 2000: Sauve-moi by Christian Vincent
 2002: Le Divorce by James Ivory
 2003: Time of the Wolf by Michael Haneke
 2011: Chicken with Plums by Marjane Satrapi

External links

1973 births
Romanian actresses
Living people
21st-century Romanian singers
21st-century Romanian women singers